Fort Macleod Airport  is located  southwest of Fort Macleod, Alberta, Canada.

History
Fort Macleod Airport was originally RCAF Station Fort Macleod, a British Commonwealth Air Training Plan facility located near the west end of Fort MacLeod.

RCAF Station Fort Macleod had six runways in an overlaid triangle configuration. All of these runways were abandoned but can be seen clearly in aerial photography. Many wartime RCAF training stations had a triangle configuration in order to allow for takeoff and landing a wide range of wind directions. The modern runway 06/24 is not one of the original runways. It was an entirely new runway constructed approximately parallel to one of the existing runways but cutting across the other four near their apex.

References

 Bruce Forsyth's Canadian Military History page

External links
Page about this airport on COPA's Places to Fly airport directory
BCATP Fort Macleod

Registered aerodromes in Alberta
Airports of the British Commonwealth Air Training Plan